Perth Theatre at 185 High Street (no longer its registered address) Perth, Scotland, opened in 1900 and was extended in the 1980s.

The building is category B listed by Historic Scotland, and is operated by the charitable organisation Horsecross Arts, alongside sister venue Perth Concert Hall.  On 4 January 2014, the theatre closed to undergo renovations and expansions. The theatre re-opened to the public in December 2017 with a pantomime. The original auditorium has been restored to its original condition. Other renovations included new seats and another smaller theatre.

History 
The theatre opened on Perth High Street in 1900 (replacing a previous one, built in 1820, that stood at the northeastern corner of Atholl and Kinnoull Streets), and was planned to seat 950 in the auditorium, with pit, two balconies and boxes. It was created by the Perth Theatre & Opera House Co Ltd and designed by Dundee's City Architect William Alexander. It is similar in style and layout to his design of Her Majesty's Theatre, Dundee, but on a smaller scale. The foundation stone was laid in 1899 by actor George Alexander. The founding lessee was JH Savile, who owned Paisley Theatre, and in 1909 bought the Perth theatre outright. The Savile family continued to run the theatre until 1935, staging drama, opera, musicals, pantomime, revues and variety. JH Savile also founded his own Repertory Companies in Paisley and Perth  which at their height produced 40 plays a year.

In 1935, Perth Theatre was sold to a new company created in London, the Perth Repertory Theatre Ltd., by Ernest Dence in support of his actress daughter Marjorie Dence, who succeeded as owner in 1937 on his death. Marjorie Dence and actor David Steuart co-founded their new venture, the Perth Repertory Company, whose annual and highly acclaimed work covered nine months of repertory in and around Perth with three months of touring of the Highlands & Islands, to the Northern Isles, and to the lowland towns of the Borders. In the first year alone 51 plays were produced. Perth Theatre hosted the first Scottish Theatre Festival in 1939 and again in 1945.

The founders added a second repertory company from 1946 to 1958, which alternated with Perth, ensuring repertory at Kirkcaldy, mainly in its Adam Smith Hall. Perth Repertory continued throughout the war and thrived until Miss Dence's passing in 1966.

In her will, Dence gave first option to buy the theatre to the Scottish Committee of the Arts Council, which did so and transferred it to Perth City Council. Joan Knight was appointed as Artistic Director in 1968, continuing the repertory company and mentoring performers and would-be-directors. During her 26-year tenure at Perth Theatre, she oversaw a major rebuilding programme in 1981 and 1985, adding a restaurant, studio theatre, rehearsal room, more dressing rooms and a workshop facility.

In 2005, Perth Theatre's sister venue, Perth Concert Hall, was launched under the direction of the Jane Spiers, first CEO of Horsecross Arts. She also began fundraising for the theatre's restoration and major redevelopment for which Richard Murphy, architects, were appointed by the Council in 2008.

Restoration 
Historic B-listed, Victorian Auditorium – This will be restored to its former glory. The upper circle will be reinstated and an orchestra area will be re-introduced. The theatre will also benefit from improvements to seating, sightlines, circulation, ventilation, lighting and new equipment.

Studio Theatre – A new 200-seat capacity, courtyard-style studio theatre will be built to meet the demand for staging small to mid-scale performances.

Creative Learning – An extension will provide a number of spaces for creative learning activities and a home for Perth Youth Theatre.

Access – For the first time there will be level access to Perth Theatre's foyer, Box Office, auditorium, creative learning spaces and café, bar and restaurant from a new Mill Street entrance. There will also be a lift to allow ease of access to all other levels. The High Street entrance, complete with iconic arch, will be retained ensuring Perth Theatre's presence on the busy shopping street remains and offering shoppers a direct route into the building.

Richard Murphy Architects, UK were appointed architects for the project in 2008.

Demolition of the theatre's 1980s extension began on 19 April 2016.

Notable figures 

Throughout its history, a number of star acts performed at Perth Theatre, including Walter Carr, Alec Guinness, Bessie Love, Una McLean, Donald Sutherland, and Edward Woodward. More recently, Crieff's own Ewan McGregor began his acting career at the theatre – McGregor is also Project Ambassador of Transform Perth Theatre.

Perth Youth Theatre 
Established in 1966 by Brian Howard and Catherine Robins, Perth Youth Theatre was the first theatre-based youth theatre group in Scotland. Perth Youth Theatre has trained young people in acting and stage craft for 50 years. Perth Youth Theatre Alumni included Stuart Cosgrove, Colin McCredie, Ewan McGregor, Sally Reid, and Rhod Sharp.

See also
List of listed buildings in Perth, Scotland

References

External links 
 

Theatres completed in 1900
1900 establishments in Scotland
Theatres in Scotland
Listed theatres in Scotland
Category B listed buildings in Perth and Kinross
Producing theatres in the United Kingdom
Listed buildings in Perth, Scotland